Ostanes pristis is a species of spiders in the family Thomisidae. It was first described in 1895 by Simon. , it is the sole species in the genus Ostanes. It is found in west Africa.

References

Thomisidae
Spiders of Africa
Spiders described in 1895